German submarine U-662 was a Type VIIC U-boat built for Nazi Germany's Kriegsmarine for service during World War II.
She was laid down on 7 May 1941 by Deutsche Werft, Hamburg as yard number 811, launched on 22 January 1942 and commissioned on 9 April 1942 under Kapitänleutnant Wolfgang Hermann.

Design
German Type VIIC submarines were preceded by the shorter Type VIIB submarines. U-662 had a displacement of  when at the surface and  while submerged. She had two shafts and two  propellers.

U-662 was fitted with five  torpedo tubes (four fitted at the bow and one at the stern), fourteen torpedoes, one  SK C/35 naval gun, 220 rounds, and a  C/30 anti-aircraft gun. The boat had a complement of between forty-four and sixty.

Service history
The boat's career began with training at 5th U-boat Flotilla on 9 April 1942, followed by active service on 1 October 1942 as part of the 7th Flotilla for the remainder of her service.

Wolfpacks
U-662 took part in eleven wolfpacks, namely:
 Panther (6 – 12 October 1942)
 Leopard (12 – 19 October 1942)
 Südwärts (24 – 26 October 1942)
 Delphin (4 – 5 November 1942)
 Spitz (22 – 31 December 1942)
 Jaguar (18 – 31 January 1943)
 Without name (27 – 30 March 1943)
 Adler (7 – 13 April 1943)
 Meise (13 – 22 April 1943)
 Specht (22 April – 4 May 1943)
 Fink (4 – 6 May 1943)

Convoy ONS 154
On the night on 26 December 1942 U-662 reported sighting Convoy ONS 154.

July 1943
On 19 July a US Liberator bomber dropped four depth charges, but broke off the attack after sustaining flak damage. U-662 escaped undamaged.

The next day, U-662 was again attacked by US aircraft, this time a Douglas B-18 Bolo aircraft, but again she escaped undamaged. She was sunk the following day.

Fate
U-662 was sunk on 21 July 1943 in the North Atlantic in position , by depth charges from US Catalina from Patrol Squadron VP-94. Apart from the commander and two other crew members, all hands were lost.

Oberleutnant zur See Heinz-Eberhard Müller was so severely injured that he was repatriated to Germany in March 1944 as he was no longer fit for combat.

"On 21 July 1943 he was attacked for an hour by Lt. Stan Auslander, USN, in a PBY and then was sent to the bottom by another Catalina piloted by Ltjg. R. H. Howland USNR. MUELLER HAD BOTH ARMES AND ONE LEG BROKEN AND INTERNAL INJURIES. He was kept afloat and alive by his chief mate, one Horst Gaertner. Gaertner swam around with Mueller in his arms for seven days, until they were picked up by a patrol craft."

Summary of raiding history

References

Bibliography

External links

German Type VIIC submarines
1942 ships
U-boats commissioned in 1942
U-boats sunk in 1943
U-boats sunk by depth charges
U-boats sunk by US aircraft
World War II shipwrecks in the Atlantic Ocean
World War II submarines of Germany
Ships built in Hamburg
Maritime incidents in July 1943